Santiago Silva Gerez (born 26 August 1990) is a Uruguayan footballer who plays for Peruvian club Deportivo Garcilaso as a forward.

Honours

Club

Peñarol

Uruguayan Primera División (1): 2012–13

References

External links

1990 births
Living people
People from Artigas, Uruguay
Association football forwards
Uruguayan footballers
Uruguayan expatriate footballers
Uruguayan Primera División players
Chilean Primera División players
Peruvian Primera División players
Categoría Primera A players
Ascenso MX players
Danubio F.C. players
Peñarol players
C.A. Cerro players
Club Deportivo Universidad de San Martín de Porres players
Sporting Cristal footballers
América de Cali footballers
Universidad de Concepción footballers
C.A. Progreso players
Club Deportivo Universidad César Vallejo footballers
Atlante F.C. footballers
Pan American Games medalists in football
Pan American Games bronze medalists for Uruguay
Footballers at the 2011 Pan American Games
Uruguayan expatriate sportspeople in Chile
Uruguayan expatriate sportspeople in Peru
Uruguayan expatriate sportspeople in Colombia
Uruguayan expatriate sportspeople in Mexico
Expatriate footballers in Chile
Expatriate footballers in Peru
Expatriate footballers in Colombia
Expatriate footballers in Mexico
Medalists at the 2011 Pan American Games